Ben Hee is a mountain in Scotland that rises to the height of .

References

External links
 Foinaven-Ben Hee Wild Land Area report from Scottish Natural Heritage website

Mountains and hills of the Northwest Highlands
Grahams
Marilyns of Scotland